Hardcore Devo Live! is a concert film and live album, showcasing Devo's June 28, 2014, performance at the Fox Theatre in Oakland, California on the 2014 Hardcore Devo Live tour. The tour commemorates the 40th anniversary of the band, and pays tribute to former band member, Bob Casale who died February 17, 2014. The set list exclusively focuses on songs written between 1974 and 1977, before Devo had a recording contract. Many of the songs had not been performed by the band since 1977. While the music is largely performed as a quartet, the band is augmented, offstage by Brian Applegate on additional keyboards and bass guitar. This was the last tour to feature Josh Freese on drums.

The show is performed in two-halves; the first, focusing on earlier material, is presented with the band seated, in street clothes, with minimal lighting, as if the audience were watching them rehearsing in a basement. After "Midget," the band puts on blue coveralls, as worn in early live shows, working in more famous songs that would later appear Q: Are We Not Men? A: We Are Devo! and Duty Now for the Future. The band is joined on the final song of the night, "Clockout," by Bob Casale's son Alex on bass.

Interviews with the surviving band members, as well as V. Vale and Toni Basil are interspersed into the performance. A "Concert-Only" option is available on the DVD and Blu-ray releases.

Track listing
Adapted from the album's liner notes.

Note
The uncredited audio playback "Booji Boy's Funeral" precedes Booji Boy's live performance of "U Got Me Bugged".

Personnel
Adapted from the album's liner notes, except where noted.

Devo
Mark Mothersbaugh – lead vocals, synthesizers, keyboards, EFX guitar
Bob Mothersbaugh – vocals, rhythm guitar, lead guitar
Gerald Casale – lead vocals, bass guitar, percussion
Josh Freese – drums

Additional musicians
Brian Applegate – keyboards on "Bamboo Bimbo" and "Social Fools", bass guitar on "Midget"
Alex Casale – bass guitar on "Clockout"

Technical
Devo – producer
Paul David Hager – record mix engineer  
Ray Amico – sound recordist
Isaac Betesh – vinyl mastering 
Mark Moskin – packaging photos
Mike Altishin – packaging photos
Michael Pilmer – packaging photos
Raymond Ahner – packaging photos  
Daniel Noble – packaging photos
Sabrina Koerber – packaging design

DVD
Keirda Bahruth – director, producer 
Richard Ballard – editor, producer 
Ed Seaman – producer 
Gerald Casale – producer 
Scott Pourroy – producer 
Bruce Dickson – director of photography 
Sabrina Koerber – packaging design
Devo – concert audio producer 
Ray Amico – concert audio recordist
Paul David Hager – concert audio mixing

References

External links
MVD's page on ''Hardcore Devo Live!'
Club Devo – Official website
 Devo Live Guide – Comprehensive guide to Devo's live performances.

Devo live albums
Devo video albums
2015 live albums
2015 video albums
Live video albums